Chandrakant Ramkrishna Patil (1 July 1921  - 16 October 1985) was an Indian social worker and agriculturalist who served as the 6th Lok Sabha member from Hingoli as the Janata Party Candidate.

Patil was son of Shri Ramkrishan Patil from Goregaon dist. Hingoli. He was educated at Shree Ganesh Vidhya Mandir School in Indore up to matriculation. He was married to Smt. Malti Patil, 1940 and had 2 sons and 2 daughters.

Patil was previously associated with the Socialist Party. He was Chairman of Panchayat Samiti during 1972—77. He was elected to Maharashtra Legislative Assembly during 1967—72 from Hingoli.

References

Marathi politicians
1921 births
People from Hingoli district
Maharashtra MLAs 1967–1972
India MPs 1977–1979
Lok Sabha members from Maharashtra
1985 deaths
People from Marathwada